Otakar is a masculine Czech given name of Germanic origin (cf. Audovacar). Notable people with the name include:

Otakar Batlička (1895–1942), Czech adventurer, journalist, ham radio operator, member of Czech Nazi resistance group in World War II
Otakar Borůvka (1899–1995), Czech mathematician best known today for his work in graph theory
Otakar Bystřina (1861–1931), pen name for a Czech writer who was a subject of Austria for much of his life
Otakar Hemele (1926–2001), Czech football player, who was a devoted player of Slavia Prague
Otakar Hollmann (1894–1967), Czech pianist who was notable in the repertoire for left-handed pianists
Otakar Hořínek (1929–2015), Czech sport shooter
Otakar Hostinský (1847–1910), Czech historian, musicologist, and professor of musical aesthetics
Otakar Janecký (born 1960), retired Czech ice hockey forward
Otakar Jaroš (1912–1943), Czech officer in the Czechoslovak forces in the Soviet Union
Otakar Jeremiáš (1892–1962), Czech composer, conductor and teacher
Otakar Kouba (1906–?), Czechoslovak canoeist who competed in the 1936 Summer Olympics
Otakar Kraus (1909–1980), Czech (later British), operatic baritone and teacher
Otakar Kubín (1883–1969), Czech painter and sculptor born in Boskovice, Moravia, Austria-Hungary
Otakar Lada (1883–1956), Bohemian fencer
Otakar Mařák (1872–1939), tenor Czech opera singer
Otakar Mareček (1943–2020), Czech rower and Olympic competitor
Otakar Motejl (1932–2010), Czech lawyer and politician
Otakar Německý (1902–1967), Czechoslovakian Nordic skier who competed in Nordic combined and Cross-country skiing in the 1920s
Otakar Nožíř (1917–2006), Czech football midfielder
Otakar Odložilík (1899–1973), Czech historian and archivist who wrote about the history of Protestantism in Bohemia and Moravia
Otakar Ostrčil (1879–1935), Czech composer and conductor
Otakar Pertold (1884–1965), Czech Indologist, religious studies historian and ethnologist
Otakar Sedloň (1885–1973), Czech realistic painter living in Prague
Otakar Ševčík (1852–1934), Czech violinist and influential teacher
Otakar Švec (1892–1955), Czech sculptor best known for his colossal granite Monument to Stalin in Prague
Otakar Švorčík (1886–1955), Czech fencer
Otakar Vávra (1911–2011), Czech film director, screenwriter and pedagogue
Otakar Vindyš (1884–1949), Czechoslovak ice hockey player and Olympic competitor
Otakar Zich (1879–1934), distinguished Czech composer and aesthetician

See also
Ottokar
Otakars
Ottakar's

Czech masculine given names